Voices of Protest: Huey Long, Father Coughlin and the Great Depression is a 1982 history by Alan Brinkley of contemporary left-wing criticism of US President Franklin D. Roosevelt's New Deal Programs, focusing primarily on Huey Long and Father Charles Coughlin.

It won the National Book Award for History in 1983.

References

External links

1982 non-fiction books

National Book Award-winning works
Huey Long